Dennis Stevens (30 November 1933 – 20 December 2012) was an English footballer, born in Dudley, Worcestershire who played in the Football League for Bolton Wanderers, Everton, Oldham Athletic and Tranmere Rovers.

Stevens began his career with Bolton Wanderers and established himself in the side as a scheming inside-forward, winning the FA Cup in 1958. He joined Everton in 1962 as cover, shortly before Bobby Collins moved to Leeds United. He became a vital member of Everton's midfield, being an ever-present in the League over two seasons and winning a League Championship medal in 1963, quickly followed by winning the 1963 FA Charity Shield. After leaving Everton, he played for Oldham Athletic and Tranmere Rovers.

Stevens was the cousin of Manchester United and England player Duncan Edwards who died as a result of the Munich Air Disaster. They played against one another at Old Trafford on 18 January 1958, where Bolton were beaten 7-2 by United, less than three weeks before the tragedy. Stevens died on 20 December 2012 after a long illness.

References

External links
 Dennis Stevens: Toffeeweb article
 

1933 births
2012 deaths
Sportspeople from Dudley
English footballers
England under-23 international footballers
Association football inside forwards
Bolton Wanderers F.C. players
Everton F.C. players
Oldham Athletic A.F.C. players
Tranmere Rovers F.C. players
English Football League players
English Football League representative players
FA Cup Final players